Charles Withers may refer to:

 Charles W. J. Withers (born 1954), Scottish historical geographer
 Charlie Withers (1922–2005), English footballer
 Charles D. Withers (born 1916), American diplomat, U.S. Ambassador to Rwanda, 1963–1966
 Charles Withers, Surveyor General of Woods, Forests, Parks, and Chases, 1720–1736